John Saunders Taylor (February 23, 1875 – 1958) was a college football player and coach as well as an attorney.

Early years
He was born on February 23, 1875, in Norfolk, Virginia, the son of Walter Herron Taylor.

Johns Hopkins
Taylor attended Johns Hopkins University and received a degree in electrical engineering. He played football and baseball.

University of Virginia
He then attended the University of Virginia, where he was one of the school's great quarterbacks.

1894
Taylor was selected All-Southern for his one season of work in 1894.

Coaching career
He assisted his alma mater and Arlie C. Jones at V. P. I.

References

External links
 

1875 births
1958 deaths
19th-century players of American football
American football quarterbacks
American lawyers
Johns Hopkins Blue Jays baseball players
Johns Hopkins Blue Jays football players
Virginia Cavaliers football coaches
Virginia Cavaliers football players
Virginia Tech Hokies football coaches
All-Southern college football players
Sportspeople from Norfolk, Virginia
Players of American football from Virginia
Baseball players from Norfolk, Virginia